Depravity may refer to:

 Total depravity, a theological doctrine that derives from the Augustinian concept of original sin
Lack of morality
Sin, an act that violates a known moral rule
in the Hebrew Bible, Jewish views on sin#Terminology
 Depravity (album), an album by A Plea for Purging

See also
Deviance
Deprivation (disambiguation)
Iniquity (disambiguation)
Perversity (disambiguation)